Mayflower Airlines was a small regional airline in the United States that operated out of two airports, the East Boston Airport (now known as Logan International Airport) in 1936, and the New Bedford Airport. Flights were in Ford Tri-Motor "Clippers" and covered Cape Cod (Hyannis, Provincetown) and the Islands (Nantucket and Martha's Vineyard). Service was also provided to Springfield, Massachusetts, as well, with fares that ranged from $5.00 to $8.00. Daily scheduled service was provided from Boston and New Bedford. Providence R.I. is also listed as a departure point to the Islands without scheduled service. The company was absorbed by Northeast Airlines in 1945. Timetables for the airline still exist and list destinations and fares.

See also 
 List of defunct airlines of the United States

External links
Information about Mayflower Airlines at airtimes.com
Mayflower Airlines timetables, at timetableimages.com

Defunct airlines of the United States
Airlines established in 1936
Airlines disestablished in 1945
American companies established in 1936
American companies disestablished in 1945
Airlines based in Massachusetts
1936 establishments in Massachusetts
1945 disestablishments in Massachusetts